Rinal Albertovitch Mukhametov (born August 21, 1989) is a Russian actor, of Volga Tatar origin.

Early life
Rinal Mukhametov was born in Alexeyevskoye, Tatar Autonomous Soviet Socialist Republic, Russian SFSR, Soviet Union (now Republic of Tatarstan, Russia). Graduated from the variety and circus department of the Kazan Theater School.

Selected filmography

References

External links 
 
 Rinal Mukhametov on kino-teatr.ru

1989 births
Living people
Russian male film actors
Russian male television actors
Russian male stage actors
21st-century Russian male actors
Tatar people of Russia
Volga Tatar people